Bowie State University (Bowie State) is a public historically black university in Prince George's County, Maryland, north of Bowie. It is part of the University System of Maryland. Founded in 1865, Bowie State is Maryland's oldest historically black university and one of the ten oldest in the country. Bowie State is a member-school of the Thurgood Marshall College Fund.

History

Teachers College
Bowie State University is the oldest historically black university in Maryland. It was founded in 1865 by the Baltimore Association for the Moral and Educational Improvement of Colored People as a teaching school. The school first used space at the African Baptist Church at Calvert Street and Saratoga Street, in Baltimore, Maryland. In 1867, a dedicated facility was purchased nearby at Saratoga Street and Courtland Street, and the school was formally named the Baltimore Normal School for Colored Teachers. After being reorganized in 1883 as the Baltimore Normal School, it educated African Americans to be teachers for African American students until 1908. At that time, the school became a state institution of teaching under the Maryland State Department of Education and was redesignated as a Normal School No. 3.

Shortly thereafter, in 1910, the school moved to the Jericho Farm, a 187-acre campus in Prince George's County. About 60 students lived in the old farmhouse. The school was renamed in 1914 as the Maryland Normal and Industrial School at Bowie. A two-year professional degree was added in 1925, a three-year program in 1931, a four-year program for elementary school teachers in 1935, a four-year program for junior high school teachers in 1951, and a four-year program for secondary school teachers in 1961. In recognition of its principal role, the school was renamed in 1935 as Maryland Teachers College at Bowie.

Bowie State University
In 1963, Bowie State College was officially named a liberal arts school – with additional majors in English, history, and social science – although emphasis remained on teacher education. A Master's degree in education was added in 1969.

The school was renamed Bowie State University in 1988, as a member of the University System of Maryland. In the subsequent decades, Bowie continued to expand, especially in professional and Science, technology, engineering, and mathematics (STEM) fields. In 1992, it became the first HBCU to expand overseas, with graduate programs for military personnel stationed abroad. By 2017, the school offered 20+ undergraduate majors and 30+ advanced degrees or certificate programs.

In the October 29, 2015 of The Economist magazine's first ever rating of Colleges in America, which was based on an statistical estimate for each college based exclusively on factors such as average SAT scores, sex ratio, race breakdown, college size, whether a university was public or private, and the mix of subjects students chose to study versus how much money its former students would make. Bowie State University ranked #61 on the list and was # 1 in the State of Maryland.

In 2020, MacKenzie Scott donated US$25 million to Bowie State. Her donation is the largest single gift in Bowie State's history.

Academics 
BSU has 22 undergraduate majors, 19 master's programs, two doctoral programs, and 14 certificate programs in disciplines as diverse as computer science, education, human resource development, organizational communication, and nursing. In partnership with the University of Maryland University College, it became the first historically black university to include overseas studies.  It was also the first university in the nation to offer a bachelor's degree in pedology.

In 1995, NASA and the National Science Foundation awarded $27 million as one of only six schools in the nation declared Model Institutions for Excellence in science, engineering, and mathematics.  This led to a strengthening of the already growing computer science program; in 1999, the Maryland Higher Education Commission approved the school's additional focus in computers and technology.  Since then new technology related programs including visual communication and digital media arts (VCDMA), music technology and a strengthened computer science department have been added. Recently the university added concentrations in fashion design, advertising design, animation, digital filmmaking and more.

The university is home to The Maryland Center, a not-for-profit organization founded in 1998 providing community services.  In partnership with the federal General Services Administration, the campus hosts the Bowie State University Telecommuting Center.

Bowie State University offers an honors program for academically talented and ambitious undergraduate students.

Schools and departments 

College of Arts and Sciences

College of Business
 Accounting, Finance, and Economics
 Management Information Systems
 Management, Marketing, and Public Administration

College of Education
 Counseling
 Educational Leadership
 Teaching, Learning, and Professional Development

College of Professional Studies
 Behavioral Sciences and Human Services
 Nursing
 Psychology
 Social Work

Campus and facilities 

The campus comprises 23 buildings with more than 988,897 square feet (92,000 m2) of space. It is located in Bowie, Maryland between the metropolitan areas of Baltimore (25 miles) and Washington D.C. (17 miles). An on-campus MARC Train station and Metrobus stops provide access to local transit. There are Wi-Fi and public computer labs across campus for student use.

Twenty-three percent of students live on campus in seven residence halls. Campus events include cultural performances, lectures and sporting events. The oldest building still in use is Harriet Tubman Hall, built in 1921. The  Student Union Building, which replaced the old Wiseman Center, was inaugurated in 2013. Other recent improvements to the campus have been the US$71 million Fine & Performing Arts Center, with 123,000 square feet for art, music, dance, and theater programs, replacing the former Martin Luther King, Jr., Arts Center.

The US$17.6 million Center for Business and Graduate Studies houses the College of Business, Graduate School, Graduate Admissions Office, the BSU Entrepreneurship Academy and the Bowie Business Innovation Center, the first business accelerator to open at a Maryland HBCU. Other facilities include the Christa McAuliffe Residential Community (CMRC) apartments, the Computer Science Building, a facility serving the computer science and computer technology programs, and the US$6.5 million Center for Learning Technology (CLT), serving the College of Professional Studies.

On campus, the Bowie State Satellite Operations Control Center (BSOCC) is an orbiting satellite operation and control center allowing students to gain hands-on experience. In 2003, he center went fully operational. It is a joint venture operated by the university, the Honeywell Corporation, and NASA's Goddard Space Flight Center in Greenbelt, Maryland.

According to county documents, the land, valued at US$1.3 million, would cost the university nothing if used "for educational uses including facilities that benefit the welfare of students and faculty in their educational experience at the University". The addition of this land would increase the size of the university by 63%. The main focus for the land is the development of additional student dorms. The land will also be used to establish several retail businesses that will cater to students and the community.

Athletics 

Bowie State's athletes compete in the Northern Division of the Central Intercollegiate Athletic Association, in the NCAA's Division II. They compete and/or train on-campus in Bulldog Stadium, the Leonidas S. James Physical Education Complex, and the A. C. Jordan Arena. The Bulldogs play the following sports:
 Basketball
 Bowling
 Cross Country
 Football
 Indoor Track & Field
 Outdoor Track & Field
 Softball
 Tennis
 Volleyball

In addition, BSU sponsors athletic clubs for students at the intramural and recreational levels. The Fitness Room in the Leonidas James Physical Education Complex also has open hours for students, faculty, and staff.

Student life 
Bowie State has many academic clubs, fraternities, honor societies, organizations, sororities, and student associations on-campus. The computer, education, French, and history clubs are examples of the academic clubs. The art guild, concert and marching bands, jazz and brass ensembles, and others allow students to explore the fine and performing arts.

Fraternities and sororities 
National Pan-Hellenic Council organizations
 Alpha Phi Alpha
 Alpha Kappa Alpha
 Delta Sigma Theta
 Kappa Alpha Psi
 Omega Psi Phi
 Phi Beta Sigma
 Zeta Phi Beta
 Sigma Gamma Rho
 Iota Phi Theta

Social organizations
 Groove Phi Groove
 Swing Phi Swing
 Alpha Nu Omega
 Chi Eta Phi
 Kappa Kappa Psi
 Tau Beta Sigma
 Lambda Lambda Lambda

Honor societies
The honor societies represented at BSU include:
 Delta Mu Delta
 Lambda Pi Eta
 Sigma Tau Delta

Media 
As of 2017, Bowie State has one student newspaper: The Spectrum.

BSU-TV Channel 74 is a cable television station that broadcasts around the clock for the BSU community, and WBSU Bulldog Nation Radio streams programming online. Both stations are operated under the aegis of the Department of Communications. They have converted from analog to digital technology. WBSU Bulldog Nation Radio was launched in 2018 with support from Maryland-based Radio One.

Music 
The Symphony of Soul, also known as SOS, is the name of the marching/concert/pep band at Bowie State University. The Symphony of Soul has received rave reviews following collegiate performances, as well as when representing the university abroad. Each year, the SOS takes a trip to Montreal, Quebec, Canada, to perform for the Alouettes de Montréal. During the fall, students always expect the usual impromptu parade through the campus by the SOS. They were also a part of the NFL 2007–2008 season opener as they performed the National Anthem with Aretha Franklin and shared the stage with other recording artist such as Aerosmith, Britney Spears, Mary J. Blige, and others. The SOS was featured in the Original Battle of the Bands held at RFK Stadium. The SOS drumline was named as one of Showtime Magazine's top ten amongst HBCU's.

Notable alumni 
 Jovan Adepo - actor
 Olubowale Victor Akintimehin, attended 2004 but not graduated – rapper, stage name Wale
 Joanne C. Benson, B.S. 1961 – Maryland State Senator
 Toni Braxton, attended but not graduated – singer, songwriter
 Towanda Braxton – singer, songwriter, and member of the singing group The Braxtons
 Gwendolyn T. Britt, B.S. 2004 – Maryland State Senator
 Henry Frazier, III, B.S. 1993, M.A. 1999 – head football coach at Bowie State University, Prairie View A&M University, and North Carolina Central University
 Eunique Jones Gibson, B.S. 2007 – content creator, director, and speaker
 Andrea Harrison, B.A. 2003 – politician
 Delano Johnson – football player in the NFL and CFL
 Christa McAuliffe, M.A. 1978 – Teacher-astronaut killed in Challenger space shuttle accident
 Susie Proctor, B.S. 1962, M.A. 1973 – Maryland State Delegate
 Isaac Redman – former American football player

References

External links 

 Official website
 Official athletics website

 
Historically black universities and colleges in the United States
Educational institutions established in 1865
Buildings and structures in Prince George's County, Maryland
Universities and colleges in Prince George's County, Maryland
1865 establishments in Maryland
Public universities and colleges in Maryland
University System of Maryland campuses